Chengdu, I Love You (translit. Chengdu, Wo Ai Ni) is a Chinese film directed by Cui Jian and Fruit Chan, and released in October 2009. Runtime is 78 minutes with languages in Mandarin and English.

Venice release 
Chengdu, I Love You had its world premiere screening in the Sala Grande at the Palazzo del Cinema on Saturday September 12, at 9:00 pm, after the awards ceremony. The 66th edition of the Venice International Film Festival was held at the Venice Lido from 2 to 12 September 2009.

However, only two of the planned three segments were screened. Director Hur Jin-ho's segment set in present-day 2008 was not included, as it was developed into a stand-alone feature film titled A Good Rain Knows.

Plot 
The film portrays two love stories centered on Chengdu that spans over a 52-year period in the years of 1976 and 2029.

The 1976 segment, directed by Fruit Chan, is about a family deals with the after effects of a devastating earthquake.

The 2029 segment, directed by Cui Jian, centers on young rock musicians who meet in a Chengdu bar as they pursue their musical dreams.

Cast
 Wu Anya
 Tan Weiwei
 Guo Tao
 Huang Xuan

References

External links
 

2009 films
2000s Mandarin-language films
Films directed by Fruit Chan

Chinese drama films